Felicity Jones is a British actress who made her debut at the age of 12 in the television film The Treasure Seekers (1996). She went on to play Ethel Hallow for one series of the television series The Worst Witch and its sequel Weirdsister College. On radio, she has played the role of Emma Grundy in the BBC's The Archers. In 2008, she appeared in the Donmar Warehouse production of The Chalk Garden. Her performance as Jane Hawking in the 2014 biographical film The Theory of Everything garnered critical acclaim, earning her nominations for the Golden Globe Award, Screen Actors Guild Award, BAFTA Award and Academy Award for Best Actress. In 2016, Jones starred as Jyn Erso in Rogue One: A Star Wars Story. That same year, she received the BAFTA Britannia Award for British Artist of the Year.

Film

Television

Stage

Radio

References

External links 
 

Actress filmographies
British filmographies